Bison is an outdoor c. 1960 stone sculpture of an American bison by an unknown artist, installed at the west entrance to the courtyard of Lawrence Hall on the University of Oregon campus in Eugene, Oregon, in the United States.

Description and history
Bison measures approximately  x  x  and rests on a brick base that measures approximately  x  x . The work was surveyed and deemed "treatment urgent" by the Smithsonian Institution's "Save Outdoor Sculpture!" program in 1994. It is administered by the University of Oregon.

See also
 1960 in art

References

1960 establishments in Oregon
1960 sculptures
Animal sculptures in Oregon
Bison in art
Outdoor sculptures in Eugene, Oregon
Statues in Eugene, Oregon
Stone sculptures in Oregon
University of Oregon campus
Stone statues